U.S. Route 51 (US 51) in Kentucky runs  through the western portion of the state from the Tennessee state line at Fulton to the Illinois state line at Cairo, Illinois. It is a mostly rural route, also serving the towns of Clinton, Arlington, Bardwell and Wickliffe. It also carries part of the Great River Road near the northern end of its route in Kentucky.

Route description
US 51 mainly runs through the Jackson Purchase region of Kentucky, spanning the four westernmost counties in Kentucky, beginning with a four-lane section crossing the state line, which begins a concurrency with the Purchase Parkway (Future I-69). US 51 follows that parkway's first  to exit 1 north of Fulton.

North of Fulton, US 51 follows a path from Fulton County, and traverses Hickman, Carlisle and Ballard counties, including going through their respective county seats, Clinton, Bardwell, and Wickliffe. At Bardwell, US 62 begins running concurrently with US 51. US 60 joins in on the overlap just before crossing the Ohio River into Alexander County, Illinois just south of Cairo.

Portions of US 51/US 62 in Carlisle and Ballard counties are part of the Great River Road National Scenic Byway.

History

Major intersections

References

External links

 Kentucky
Transportation in Fulton County, Kentucky
Transportation in Hickman County, Kentucky
Transportation in Carlisle County, Kentucky
Transportation in Ballard County, Kentucky
51